This is a list of the commemorative stamps of the United Kingdom for the years 2010–2019.

List

2010

2011

2012

2013

2014

2015

2016

2017

2018

2019

Other periods
 United Kingdom commemorative stamps 1924–1969
 United Kingdom commemorative stamps 1970–1979
 United Kingdom commemorative stamps 1980–1989
 United Kingdom commemorative stamps 1990–1999
 United Kingdom commemorative stamps 2000–2009
 United Kingdom commemorative stamps 2020–2029

See also

 Stanley Gibbons
 Stamp collecting
 List of people on stamps
 Philately
 Stamps
 PHQ Cards

References

External links
 Stanley Gibbons Stamps Shop Homepage
 Royal Mail
 Collect GB Stamps
 Gibbons Stamp Monthly

2010
Commemorative stamps
Lists of postage stamps
Commemorative
Commemorative stamps